Isidore Bethel is a French-American filmmaker whom Filmmaker named one of the "25 New Faces of Independent Film" in 2020. The films he edits, directs, and produces use filmmaking to make sense of overwhelming experiences and touch on recurrent themes of displacement, sexuality, aging, trauma, grief, therapy, and art-making. His first feature film as director, Liam, premiered at the Boston LGBT Film Festival in 2018 and received the Jury Prize in the Documentary section of the Paris LGBTQ+ Film Festival. His second film, Acts of Love, which French actor Francis Leplay co-directed, premiered at Hot Docs and received the Tacoma Film Festival's Best Feature Award in 2021.

Films he has edited have screened at Cannes, SXSW, and the Berlinale, in museums such as the Museum of Modern Art, the Beirut Art Center, and the Pompidou Center, and on broadcast platforms such as POV, The New York Times' Op-Docs, and Netflix. He has worked in France, Mexico, and the United States with directors such as Dominique Cabrera, Jean-Xavier de Lestrade, Juan Pablo González, Laurent Bécue-Renard, Juan Manuel Sepúlveda, Arturo González Villaseñor, Daniel Hymanson, and Iliana Sosa. He has also collaborated with filmmakers in Lebanon, the United Kingdom, Ethiopia, India, and Turkey. He acts as a producer on many of the films that he edits, which have received support from the Sundance Institute, the Ford Foundation, Field of Vision, the CNC in France, and Mexico's IMCINE and FONCA funds. Critics have characterized his editing as demonstrative of "admirable restraint," "tender," "astute," and "elegant."

A graduate of Harvard University, the École Normale Supérieure, and the School of the Art Institute of Chicago, Bethel has received funding from the Institut Français, France's Île-de-France region, the Jean-Luc Lagardère Foundation, and the Jack Kent Cooke Foundation as well as support from Berlinale Talents, the Tribeca Film Institute, the Villa Medici, the Gotham, Film Independent, the Logan Nonfiction Program, and Eurodoc. He has taught at Stone Soup's filmmaking workshop, Sundance's Art of Editing fellowship, Sarah Lawrence College's Paris campus, La Fémis, and Parsons Paris.

Filmography

Feature films

Short films

References 

American film directors
American film editors
École Normale Supérieure alumni
Harvard University alumni
School of the Art Institute of Chicago alumni
French film directors
French film editors
LGBT film directors
LGBT film producers
1989 births
Living people
French film producers
American film producers